DB Schenker is a division of German rail operator Deutsche Bahn that focuses on logistics. The company was acquired by Deutsche Bahn as Schenker-Stinnes in 2002. It comprises divisions for air, land, sea freight, and Contract Logistics.

History

In his biography, then CEO of Deutsche Bahn Hartmut Mehdorn justified the acquisition of international logistics companies with customer demand. In 2000, analysis had shown the 200 largest customers ship up to 60% of their freight abroad. Since the core operating territory had been Germany, customers were lost to competitors with a more compelling international offer. There was no time to grow organically in such markets. This analysis led to the acquisition of Stinnes AG and the associated brand name Schenker. 
Since December 2007 DB Schenker has been the freight logistics subsidiary of Deutsche Bahn. DB Schenker combines all transport and logistic activities of Deutsche Bahn (except rail cargo), employing over 72,000 staff spread across about 2,000 locations in about 140 countries. In 2021, DB Schenker cooperated with logistics startup Volocopter to introduce heavy-lift drones. The same year, the company launched Schenker Ventures, its own venture capital arm to invest in innovation in the logistics industry. Schenker Ventures announced its first investment in German logistics startup Warehousing1.

Organization 
Schenker AG and its many subsidiaries handle worldwide logistics operations including Land Transport, Air and Ocean Freight as well as Contract Logistics/SCM, and is part of the DB Schenker organization. Since 2016, rail freight business no longer operates under the brand DB Schenker Rail. Instead, it operates as a standalone business unit under the brand name DB Cargo in Deutsche Bahn Group.

Key Customers 
DB Schenker serves many global and local firms across all industries. Notably, DB Schenker manages large and complex supply chains for multinationals such as Apple, Procter & Gamble, Dell, ASML, BMW and many more.

Controversies 
In 2016, DB Schenker was convicted for consecutive cases of corruption in St Petersburg, Russia, bribing local customs officials from 2010 to mid-2012. At the time, DB Schenker involved a Russian agency for enabling the rapid flow of shipments to carmaker Ford's St Petersburg facility. DB Schenker had to pay a penalty of €2m.

In September 2015, then and current CEO Jochen Thewes slapped and pushed a cab driver, who refused to pick up a drunken Thewes, in downtown Singapore. He also kicked the car and caused damage. Thewes was eventually sentenced to a fine of S$1000 and two weeks of jailtime in Singapore.

In 2020, DB Schenker was accused of unfair price dumping during the COVID-19 pandemic and related market turbulences. Allegedly, it was using its status as a state-owned company (as subsidiary of Deutsche Bahn) to request prices from subcontractors below their production costs for some European land routes via the freight exchange Timocom. The company rejected the allegations, pointing out that it has no insights in pricing strategies and production costs of subcontractors. However, it announced it would temporarily refrain from using fixed prices for transports published via freight exchanges.

See also
 Gottfried Schenker

References

Logistics companies of Germany
Deutsche Bahn